Juan Aguilar may refer to:

 Juan Aguilar (footballer) (born 1989), Paraguayan footballer
 Juan Aguilar (boxer) (1943–2015), Argentine boxer
 Juan Carlos Aguilar (born 1998), British-born Canadian tennis player